Store Damme is a village in Fanefjord Parish on the western part of the Danish island of Møn, Vordingborg Municipality. With a population of 587 (1 January 2022) it is the second largest community on the island after Stege.

The village was the site of a rytterskole (English: rider school) from 1726.

Fanefjord Church is located about 2 kilometres south of Store Damme close to the inlet Fanefjord.

In 1992, thanks to the support of Karen Strand (1924–2000), the Danish Jewellery Museum (Danmarks Smykkemuseum) was inaugurated in Store Damme

References

Cities and towns in Region Zealand
Møn